Leopold Rudolf (3 May 1911 – 4 June 1978) was an Austrian stage, film and television actor.

Selected filmography
 After the Storm (1948)
 The Other Life (1948)
 Lambert Feels Threatened (1949)
 Cordula (1950)
 The Fourth Commandment (1950)
 Archduke Johann's Great Love (1950)
 Maria Theresa (1951)
 Vienna Waltzes (1951)
 1. April 2000 (1952)
 The Last Reserves (1953)
 The Witch (1954)
 Mozart (1955)
 The Long Day of Inspector Blomfield (1968)

References

Bibliography 
 Fritsche, Maria. Homemade Men In Postwar Austrian Cinema: Nationhood, Genre and Masculinity . Berghahn Books, 2013.

External links 
 

1911 births
1978 deaths
Austrian male television actors
Austrian male film actors
Austrian male stage actors
Male actors from Vienna